Barbara "Bobbie" Stauffacher Solomon (born 1928) is an American landscape architect and graphic designer. She is well known for the large scale interior Supergraphics that were highly influential in the 1960s and 70s and exterior signage at Sea Ranch in Sonoma County, California.

Early life and education
Barbara Stauffacher Solomon was born in 1928 as a third-generation San Franciscan. As a young woman Stauffacher Solomon studied and worked as a dancer, as well as studying painting and sculpture at San Francisco Art Institute.

In 1948, at 20 years-old, she married the filmmaker Frank Stauffacher. The designer and printmaker Jack Stauffacher was her brother in law.

In 1956, after the death of her husband, Stauffacher Solomon moved to Basel, Switzerland to study graphic design at the Basel Art Institute with Armin Hofmann from 1956 to 1959. She made the decision to study design because she knew she could make a living and needed to support herself and her small child. She later studied Architecture at the University of California, Berkeley and graduated in 1981, writing her thesis on Green Architecture & The Agrarian Garden.

She remarried in 1969 to Daniel Solomon, an architect and professor. Their daughter, Nellie King Solomon, is also an artist, and has showed at exhibitions with Stauffacher Solomon.

Career
Stauffacher Solomon returned to San Francisco in 1962 and set up an office as a graphic designer where she designed the monthly program guides for the San Francisco Museum of Modern Art.

She met landscape architect Lawrence Halprin who gave her work at Sea Ranch in 1968, where she designed the architectural scale paintings for the building interiors, due to her educational background. Her work at Sea Ranch grew from her vocabulary of signs to create motion and an awareness of space. She created the logo for Sea Ranch that was a cross between Swiss design and California impressionalism to interpret the property's rams and crashing waves. Halprin went on to recommend her to other architects in the San Francisco area who let her design what she wanted. She went on to receive two American Institute of Architects (AIA) awards for her work at Sea Ranch.

Stauffacher Solomon was an instructor at Harvard University and Yale University, where she was invited by Charles Moore, whom she had met while working at Sea Ranch, to lead a studio on supergraphics in 1968. The studio was a week-long project creating two-dimensional graphics that reinforced the architecture of Yale University's Art and Architecture elevators. It was wildly successful and heralded by Ada Louise Huxtable as a protest against the Establishment.

In the short period of its existence from 1970 until 1971 she was art director of Scanlan's Magazine.

In 1995, she designed a large outdoor art installation called "Promenade Ribbon" for the city of San Francisco. In 2002, Stauffacher Solomon was a member of the San Francisco Art Commission. In 2015, Stauffacher Solomon works as a landscape architect and continues to realize large scale graphic interventions outside.

Stauffacher Solomon is the author of the autobiographic book Why? Why not?.

Books 
 Green Architecture: Notes on the Common Ground (Design quarterly 120), 1982
 Green Architecture and the Agrarian Garden, 1989 

 Why? Why Not?, 2013
 Utopia Myopia, 2013

Exhibitions 
Stauffacher Solomon's drawings and supergraphics have been included in a number of museum exhibitions

In 2018, she created the supergraphic installation Land(e)scape 2018 at the Berkeley Art Museum.

In 2019, she was the subject of a solo exhibition at the San Francisco Museum of Modern Art (SFMOMA).

From March to May 2021, Barbara Stauffacher Solomon's solo show GROP at Gallery Van Bartha in Basel, curated by Matylda Krzykowski, showcases over 40 drawings and paintings by the artist from 1980s to 2021. Krzykowski introduced Stauffacher Solomon to the gallery.

References

External links 
 Official website
 SFMOMA-Exhibition The Sea Ranch, Architecture, Environment, and Idealism. December 22, 2018—April 28, 2019.

American graphic designers
American landscape architects
1928 births
Living people
California people in design
Women graphic designers
Women landscape architects
Artists from the San Francisco Bay Area
San Francisco Art Institute alumni
University of California, Berkeley alumni
20th-century American artists
20th-century American women artists
American expatriates in Switzerland
21st-century American women